Yang Hyung-mo (born 16 July 1991) is a South Korean footballer who plays as goalkeeper for Suwon Samsung Bluewings.

References

External links
 
 

1991 births
Living people
Association football goalkeepers
South Korean footballers
Suwon Samsung Bluewings players
K League 1 players
Asan Mugunghwa FC players
Korea National League players
Chungbuk National University alumni